Bulanık is a town and district of Muş Province, Turkey

Bulanık (literally "murky" or "blurry" in Turkish) may refer to the following places in Turkey:

 Bulanık, Ardanuç, a village in the district of Ardanuç, Artvin Province
 Bulanık, Çay, a village in the district of Çay, Afyonkarahisar Province
 Bulanık, Göynük, a village in the district of Göynük, Bolu Province
 Bulanık, Mudurnu, a village in the district of Mudurnu, Bolu Province
 Bulanık, Üzümlü